The brothers Shen Changyin (沈长银, January 26, 1975 – April 27, 2006) and Shen Changping (沈长平, March 8, 1983  – April 27, 2006) are Chinese serial killers and cannibals who murdered and ate the livers of 11 sex workers between June 2003 and August 2004. They were aided by Li Chunling and three other female accomplices.

Murders 
In June 2003, the Shen brothers began murdering sex workers in Lanzhou, Gansu, China. Their first victim was Yao Fang, whom they lured to a house and tied up. After forcing her to provide her bank account PIN, they strangled and dismembered her.

In late November 2003, the Shens robbed Li Chunling in the same manner as Yao; however, they decided against killing her when she offered to bring them more victims.  When Li brought them a woman several days later, the brothers robbed her then forced Li to kill her. Then they removed her kidney, burned her body with sulphuric acid, and flushed it down the toilet. The victim was a sex worker. 

After murdering three more women in this manner, the Shens and Li moved to Taiyuan, Shanxi in April 2004. There they lured Zhao Meiying and forced her to bring a sex worker to their home. The Shens then forced Zhao to stab the woman and put the body in a  meat processor before flushing the chemical-dipped pieces down the  toilet.

After Zhao surrendered to police and Li was caught, the Shens continued to murder women in Hefei, Anhui; Baotou, Inner Mongolia; and Shijiazhuang, Hebei.

Arrest and sentencing 
In August 2004, the Shens and an accomplice, Du Surong, were caught in a Shijiazhuang apartment while trying to douse the dismembered body of a victim with acid. The Shens confessed to robbing and killing 11 women. They had plotted the murders after they lost money when their Lanzhou auto parts business failed. Shen Changyin also confessed to murdering a man in their hometown of Nanwu, Henan in 1999, after which the brothers fled in 2000.

The Shens and Li were sentenced to death in September 2005. Three other female accomplices were sentenced to three to 20 years in prison.

The Shens and Li were all executed by lethal injection on April 27, 2006.

See also
 List of serial killers by number of victims

References

1976 births
1984 births
2003 murders in China
2004 murders in China
2006 deaths
21st-century Chinese criminals
Cannibals
Chinese male criminals
Chinese people convicted of murder
Criminal duos
Executed Chinese serial killers
Male serial killers
People convicted of murder by the People's Republic of China
People executed by China by lethal injection
Sibling duos
Violence against women in China